Bella Asha Maria Belaynesh Forsgrén (born 10 February 1992 in Addis Ababa) is a Finnish politician of the Green League who has been serving as a member of the Parliament of Finland since 2019, representing the Central Finland constituency. She is the country's first Black woman member of parliament.

Early life
Forsgrén was adopted from Ethiopia to Finland when she was three years old.

References

1992 births
Living people
People from Addis Ababa
Finnish people of Ethiopian descent
Green League politicians
Members of the Parliament of Finland (2019–23)
21st-century Finnish women politicians
Women members of the Parliament of Finland
Ethiopian emigrants
Finnish adoptees
People with acquired Finnish citizenship